The 2022 Charlotte Independence season will be the 7th season of the club's existence. This will be the club's first season in USL League One, a move the club announced in December of 2021 after playing in USL Championship since 2019. It will be the club's first season in the third division of the American soccer pyramid since 2016. The club are coming off of a season that saw them finish 4th in the eastern conference, and advance to the conference semifinals

Club

Roster

Competitions

Exhibitions

USL League One

Standings

Match results

USL League One playoffs

U.S. Open Cup

References

Charlotte Independence seasons
Charlotte Independence
Charlotte Independence
Charlotte Independence